Iakovidis Diakoumakos (1913–1996) was a Greek rower. He competed in the men's coxed pair event at the 1948 Summer Olympics.

References

1913 births
1996 deaths
Greek male rowers
Olympic rowers of Greece
Rowers at the 1948 Summer Olympics
Place of birth missing